Galium latifolium (purple bedstraw) is a North American species of plants in the madder family. It is native to eastern North America, primarily the Appalachian Mountains from Pennsylvania to Alabama. There are also a few lowland populations in eastern Maryland and eastern South Carolina.

References

External links
State of Pennsylvania, Natural Heritage Program, plant species of concern
United States Department of Agriculture plants profile

latifolium
Flora of the Eastern United States
Flora of the Appalachian Mountains
Endemic flora of the United States
Plants described in 1803
Taxa named by André Michaux
Flora without expected TNC conservation status